Ehsan Hajsafi (born 25 February 1990) is an Iranian professional footballer who plays as a left-back for Greek Super League club AEK Athens and captains the Iran national team.

Hajsafi is regarded as a utility player, being able to play as left midfielder, left-back, defensive midfielder, and winger.

In 2009, Hajsafi was selected by Goal.com as the most promising player in Asian football.
Hajsafi has represented Iran at the 2014 and 2018 FIFA World Cups and also 2011, 2015 and 2019 AFC Asian Cup tournaments, in addition to Sepahan at the 2007 FIFA Club World Cup.

Club career

Sepahan

Hajsafi started his career in Zob Ahan in 2000 and left the club in 2006, joining Sepahan.
He was extracted from Sepahan youth academy by Luka Bonačić. Hajsafi played two matches from the start in the 2007 FIFA Club World Cup and has been a regular for Sepahan during recent seasons. Sepahan came second in the 2007 AFC Champions League.

Ehsan takes set pieces for Sepahan and plays both in central and left midfield, having scored six league goals for Sepahan in the 2007–08 season. In the last game of the league match against Persepolis, Hajsafi scored a goal for Sepahan that could have granted Sepahan the title, but Persepolis scored the vital winning goal in stoppage time to win the title. He continued to perform well and scored wonderful goals for Sepahan in the 2008–09 season. He was tested as the left back in the 2009–10 season when Sepahan won the league, and extended his contract with Sepahan for two another years.

Tractor (loan)
In June 2011, Hajsafi signed a one and a half year loan conscription contract with Tractor, reuniting him with former coach Amir Ghalenoei. Tractor finished second in the league, their best results in club history. His contract with Tractor ended in January 2012, and he returned to Sepahan.

Return to Sepahan
Hajsafi returned to Sepahan in January 2012, beginning this time with coach Zlatko Kranjčar. He won the Hazfi Cup with the team and extended his contract with Sepahan for another two seasons at the end of the season. In August 2014 after the end of his contract Hajsafi was close to signing with Championship side Fulham, but the deal fell through due to work permit issues. Hajsafi returned to Iran and extended his contract for another two seasons with Sepahan.

FSV Frankfurt
On 30 August 2015, Hajsafi joined FSV Frankfurt in the 2. Bundesliga on a two-year contract. He made his league debut on 13 September 2015 as a second-half substitute against Eintracht Braunschweig. He made his first start a week later as a left-back on 20 September in a 1–0 league win over MSV Duisburg. Hajsafi quickly established himself as the set-piece taker. Hajsafi scored his first goal for FSV Frankfurt on 2 March 2016 in a 3–3 draw against MSV Duisburg. On 13 March 2016, he scored from 50 yards against SC Freiburg.

After FSV was relegated to the 3. Liga, the club announced that they had annulled the contract of Hajsafi and he was a free agent and could sign with any club.

Panionios
On 24 June 2017, Hajsafi signed a two-year contract with Greek Super League side Panionios. He is set to team up with fellow countryman Masoud Shojaei at Panionios. Hajsafi became the third Iranian in recent years to play for the club.

Hajsafi made his first appearance for the club on 13 July 2017 in a second round Europa League qualifying match against Slovenian club Gorica. On 20 August 2017, on his league debut with Panionios, Hajsafi recorded an assist from a corner kick.

Olympiacos
On 29 December 2017, after six months with Panionios, Hajisafi reached an agreement with Greek side Olympiacos, signing a three and a half years' contract for a transfer fee of €600,000. His contract, was worth €400,000 per year. The 27-year-old player was the team's first transfer in the January window. On 11 February 2018, he made his debut with the club in the Superleague Greece as a starter, scoring a late goal as he bundled home the rebound to seal a point for Olympiacos when Atromitos keeper Andreas Gianniotis saved Uros Djurdjevic's penalty-kick.

Tractor 
On 2 September 2018, Hajisafi returned to Tractor on a three-year contract.

AEK Athens
On 3 August 2021, Iran international midfielder Ehsan Hajsafi joined Greek football team AEK Athens. The 31-year-old winger was a member of Iranian team Sepahan in the last half of the season. Hajsafi had played for another Greek Super League club Olympiacos in 2018. On 24 October 2021, he came in as a late substitute and sealed a 3–1 away win against Volos, after a magnificent run from Steven Zuber.

International career 
Hajsafi competed for the Iran U17 national team at the 2006 AFC Youth Championship. He later went on to appear for the U-20 and U-23 teams.

On 25 May 2008, Hajsafi played his first A national team match for the senior national team in a friendly game against Zambia. He shone in his debut with two brilliant assists in Iran's 3–2 win at Azadi Stadium. On 2 June, he then played in Iran's 2010 FIFA World Cup World Cup qualification against United Arab Emirates at home. In the return game, Hajsafi came on as a substitute to help Iran win the crucial away game.

His first international goal was against Qatar in the 2008 West Asian Football Federation Championship, when Iran went on to win 6–1. He played in 2011 AFC Asian Cup qualification, which was considered the best left side of the competition. He also played for the team in the tournament, in which Iran was eliminated in the Round 16 by South Korea. In March 2014, he was assigned as captain for the first time in his 57th national cap against Kuwait.

On 1 June 2014, he was called into Iran's 2014 FIFA World Cup squad by Carlos Queiroz. He played the full 90 minutes in Iran's first match against Nigeria which ended 0–0. He then started in a match against Argentina and was one of the key players in the match. He substituted in the 88th minute and then Argentina scored their lone goal by Lionel Messi. He also played 63 minutes in Iran's final match against Bosnia and Herzegovina. Iran were eliminated in the group stages. He was called into Iran's 2015 AFC Asian Cup squad on 30 December 2014 by Carlos Queiroz. On 11 January 2015, in Iran's opening match of the tournament, Hajsafi scored the first goal and was named man of the match in a 2–0 win against Bahrain.

On 10 August 2017, Hajsafi was banned from the national team, along with teammate Masoud Shojaei, for playing with their club Panionios against Israeli club Maccabi Tel Aviv. His ban was rescinded after posting a religious message on his Instagram. In May 2018 he was named in Iran's preliminary squad for the 2018 World Cup in Russia. He played his 100th international game on 15 November 2018 at the age of 28 in Azadi Stadium against Trinidad and Tobago.

At the 2022 FIFA World Cup, while the Mahsa Amini protests were ongoing, the Iranian team decline to sing the national anthem before their match against England. Hajsafi stated that the team supported the protestors.

Career statistics

Club

International

Scores and results list Iran's goal tally first, score column indicates score after each Hajsafi goal.

Honours
Sepahan
Persian Gulf Pro League: 2009–10, 2010–11, 2014–15
Hazfi Cup: 2005–06, 2006–07, 2012–13
AFC Champions League: runner-up 2007

Tractor
Hazfi Cup: 2019–20

Iran
WAFF Championship: 2008

Individual
 Persian Gulf Pro League Young Player of the Year: 2007–08
 Persian Gulf Pro League Top Goal Assistant: 2009–10 (13), 2011–12 (11), 2016–17 (8)
 Persian Gulf Pro League Defender of the Year: 2009–10, 2011–12
 Persian Gulf Pro League Team of the Year: 2011–12, 2016–17

See also
 List of men's footballers with 100 or more international caps

References

External links

1990 births
Living people
People from Kashan
Association football defenders
Association football midfielders
Association football utility players
Iranian footballers
Iran international footballers
Sepahan S.C. footballers
Tractor S.C. players
FSV Frankfurt players
Panionios F.C. players
Olympiacos F.C. players
AEK Athens F.C. players
Persian Gulf Pro League players
2. Bundesliga players
Super League Greece players
FIFA Century Club
Footballers at the 2010 Asian Games
2011 AFC Asian Cup players
2014 FIFA World Cup players
2015 AFC Asian Cup players
2018 FIFA World Cup players
2019 AFC Asian Cup players
Asian Games competitors for Iran
Iranian expatriate footballers
Expatriate footballers in Germany
Expatriate footballers in Greece
Iranian expatriate sportspeople in Germany
Iranian expatriate sportspeople in Greece
2022 FIFA World Cup players